John Ralph "Jack" Hayden  (born c. 1950) is a Canadian politician and former Member of the Legislative Assembly of Alberta, who represented the constituency of Drumheller-Stettler as a Progressive Conservative from 2007 to 2012.

Political career

Hayden was elected to his second term representing the constituents of Drumheller-Stettler with 69 per cent of the vote in the 2008 provincial election. He was appointed as Minister of Infrastructure after the election by Premier Ed Stelmach.

Hayden was first elected in a 2007 by-election, winning 58 per cent of the vote, to fill a spot left vacant when Shirley McClellan, a 20-year veteran of the Legislature, resigned. In 2006, he was rural campaign chair for Premier Ed Stelmach's leadership bid.

Before entering provincial politics, Hayden was involved in municipal government. He was a councillor and reeve in the County of Stettler. Hayden was elected president of the Alberta Association of Municipal Districts and Counties in 1998, and remained president until he vacated his position are reeve in 2004.

Hayden represented rural interests on numerous committees, including Prime Minister Paul Martin's External Advisory Committee on Cities and Communities, and numerous provincial advisory boards. He was placed on the Federation of Canadian Municipalities Roll of Honour in 2006, after serving on the board of directors for six years.

Personal life

Hayden lives on a farm near Endiang. Jack has three grown children.

In 2002, he was awarded a Queen Elizabeth II Golden Jubilee Medal, honouring his service to community.

Election results

References 

Progressive Conservative Association of Alberta MLAs
Living people
Members of the Executive Council of Alberta
21st-century Canadian politicians
Year of birth missing (living people)